Berezovka is a rural locality (a selo) and the administrative center of Beryozovsky Selsoviet, Soloneshensky District, Altai Krai, Russia. The population was 683 as of 2013. There are 8 streets.

Geography 
Berezovka is located on the Beryozovka River, 36 km northwest of Soloneshnoye (the district's administrative centre) by road. Yurtnoye and Sibiryachikha are the nearest rural localities.

References 

Rural localities in Soloneshensky District